Katarzyna Dulnik (born November 28, 1968) is a former Polish female professional basketball player.

Achievements

Based on
 unless otherwise noted.

Team
 Polish Champion (1999)
 Polish Cup finalist (1991)

Individual

 PLKK regular season MVP (1995)
 Included in the 1st squad of PLKK (2004)
 Leader:
 PLKK shooters (2004)
 PLKK in rebounds (2004)

Representation
European Champion (1999)
 World Cup Bronze +40 (2009)
 Participant:
 Eurobasket qualifiers (1997)
 +40 European Championships (2010 – 4th place)

Coaching
 Bronze of the Polish Academic Championships (2015)

References

External links
Profile at fibaeurope.com
Profile at eurobasket.com

1968 births
Living people
Basketball players from Warsaw
Polish women's basketball players
Power forwards (basketball)
Shooting guards